Bossiaea aurantiaca is a species of flowering plant in the family Fabaceae and is endemic to the south-west of Western Australia. It is a rounded or spreading, spiny shrub with oblong to narrow egg-shaped leaves, and golden-yellow and pinkish-red flowers.

Description

Taxonomy and naming
Bossiaea aurantiaca was first formally described in 2006 by James Henderson Ross in the journal Muelleria from specimens collected north-west of Norseman in 1998. The specific epithet (aurantiaca) means "of orange colour".

Distribution and habitat
This bossiaea grows in mallee scrub in low-lying situations in the Coolgardie biogeographic region of south-western Western Australia, centred around Norseman.

Conservation status
Bossiaea aurantiaca is classified as "Priority One" by the Government of Western Australia Department of Parks and Wildlife, meaning that it is known from only one or a few locations which are potentially at risk.

References

aurantiaca
Eudicots of Western Australia
Plants described in 2006